Leo Elwood Allen (October 5, 1898 – January 19, 1973) was an American politician from Illinois.

Born in Elizabeth, Illinois, Allen's maternal grandparents were German immigrants and his paternal grandfather was from England. He attended public schools and graduated from the University of Michigan in Ann Arbor in 1923. During the First World War, he served as a sergeant in the 123rd Field Artillery Regiment between 1917 and 1919. He taught school in Galena, Illinois in 1922 and 1923 and was clerk of the circuit court of Jo Daviess County from 1924 to 1932. He studied law and was admitted to the bar in 1930, starting a practice in Galena.

Allen was elected as a Republican to the United States House of Representatives in 1932 and would be re-elected thirteen additional times, serving from March 4, 1933, to January 3, 1961. He twice served as chairman of the House Committee on Rules during the two Congresses he served in which the Republicans held majorities, the 80th Congress (1947–1949) and the 83rd Congress (1953–1955). Allen voted in favor of the Civil Rights Acts of 1957 and 1960. Allen declined to seek a fifteenth term in 1960 and retired in Galena, where he died on January 19, 1973. He is buried in Greenwood Cemetery.

References

External links
Political Graveyard

1898 births
1973 deaths
20th-century American politicians
United States Army personnel of World War I
American people of English descent
American people of German descent
Illinois lawyers
Military personnel from Illinois
People from Elizabeth, Illinois
People from Galena, Illinois
Republican Party members of the United States House of Representatives from Illinois
Schoolteachers from Illinois
United States Army soldiers
University of Michigan alumni
20th-century American lawyers